The following is a list of pop-punk studio albums by notable artists that have been described as such by music reviews or any similar source. They are listed in chronological order.

1970s

1980s

1990s

2000s

2010s

2020s

See also
 List of pop punk bands
 List of emo pop albums

References

Bibliography

 
 
 
 
 

 
 
Pop punk